Gustavsberg is a locality situated on the island of Värmdö in Sweden's Stockholm archipelago. From an administrative perspective, it is in Stockholm County and is the seat of Värmdö Municipality. It has 11,333 inhabitants as of 2010. It is most known for its porcelain factory, Gustavsberg porcelain, and toilet bowls distributed nationwide and internationally.

References

External links 

  article Gustafsberg from Nordisk familjebok (1909)

Coastal cities and towns in Sweden
Municipal seats of Stockholm County
Swedish municipal seats
Populated places in Värmdö Municipality